Cipriano Chemello (19 July 1945 – 14 February 2017) was an Italian cyclist.

Biography
Chemello won the Olympic bronze medal at the 1968 Summer Olympics in team pursuit with Lorenzo Bosisio, Giorgio Morbiato, and Luigi Roncaglia.

See also
 Italian medals in cycling at the Olympic Games

References

External links
 
 
 

1945 births
2017 deaths
Italian male cyclists
Cyclists at the 1968 Summer Olympics
Olympic cyclists of Italy
Olympic bronze medalists for Italy
Olympic medalists in cycling
Cyclists from the Province of Treviso
Medalists at the 1968 Summer Olympics